Èric Cervós Noguer (born 18 May 1999) is an Andorran tennis player.

Cervós Noguer represents Andorra at the Davis Cup, where he has a W/L record of 7–21.

Davis Cup

Participations: (7–21)

   indicates the outcome of the Davis Cup match followed by the score, date, place of event, the zonal classification and its phase, and the court surface.

* Walkover doesn't count in his overall record.

External links

1999 births
Living people
Andorran male tennis players